Mules Island (Id:Pulau Mules), also known as Nuca Molas, is an island in the Savu Sea. The island is administrated as part of East Nusa Tenggara Province of Indonesia.

Description 
Myles Island is located in the Savu Sea and is located just south of the island of Flores. The economy of the island is dominated by farming and fishing, though in 2018 the government of Indonesia began to invest on the island as a tourist destination.

The island is intermittently affected by water shortages. The island is a nesting ground for both endemic and migratory birds.

References 

Islands of Indonesia
Populated places in Indonesia